Whangarei District Council is the territorial authority for the Whangarei District of New Zealand.

The council is led by the mayor of Whangarei, who is currently . There are 13 councillors.

Composition

2019–2022

 Sheryl Mai, mayor
 Greg Innes, deputy mayor
 Shelley Deeming, councillor for Bream Bay ward
 Ken Couper, councillor for Bream Bay ward
 Gavin Benney, councillor for Denby ward
 Jayne Golightly, councillor for Denby ward
 Tricia Cutforth, councillor for Denby ward
 Anna Murphy, councillor for Hikurangi Coastal ward
 Simon Reid, councillor for Mangakāhia-Maungatapere ward
 Carol Peters, councillor for Okara ward
 Nicholas Connop, councillor for Okara ward
 Phil Halse, councillor for Okara ward
 Vince Cocurullo, councillor for Okara ward

References

External links

 Official website

Whangarei District
Politics of the Northland Region
Territorial authorities of New Zealand